Richard Bradley  (born 13 December 1964) is a South African philosopher. He is a professor at the London School of Economics and Political Science, a project leader at the Centre for Philosophy of Natural and Social Science, and the former editor of the journal Economics and Philosophy.

Bradley is best known for work on decision theory, formal epistemology, semantics, and climate change policy. His PhD thesis began his work on decisions involving conditional attitudes, which culminates in his 2017 book Decision Theory with a Human Face.

On 22 July 2022, Bradley was elected a Fellow of the British Academy (FBA), the United Kingdom's national academy for the humanities and social sciences.

Biography
Bradley attended the University of Witwatersrand studying economics, politics and sociology. He holds an MSc in Social Philosophy from the LSE and completed his doctorate at the University of Chicago, under the supervision of Richard Jeffrey and David Malament.

Selected publications

References 

Academics of the London School of Economics
South African philosophers
1964 births
Living people